The 9th Legislative Assembly of Saskatchewan was elected in the Saskatchewan general election held in June 1938. The assembly sat from January 19, 1939, to May 10, 1944. The Liberal Party led by William John Patterson formed the government. The Co-operative Commonwealth Federation (CCF) led by George Hara Williams formed the official opposition. After Williams resigned his seat to serve in the army in 1941, John Hewgill Brockelbank became house leader for the CCF.

Charles Agar served as speaker for the assembly.

Members of the Assembly 
The following members were elected to the assembly in 1938:

Notes:

Party Standings 

Notes:

By-elections 
By-elections were held to replace members for various reasons:

Notes:

References 

Terms of the Saskatchewan Legislature